Lone Rider is a 2008 American Western television film. It was directed by David S. Cass Sr. and stars Lou Diamond Phillips and Stacy Keach.

Plot
Bobby Hattaway (Lou Diamond Phillips), an honored soldier, returns home after the American Civil War to find his father's (Stacy Keach) formerly prosperous store now dangerously in debt to the town's ruthless leader, and Bobby's childhood friend, Stu Croker (Vincent Spano). Bobby will now face off against his former friend to take control from Stu.

Cast
 Lou Diamond Phillips as Bobby Hattaway
 Stacy Keach as Robert Hattaway
 Vincent Spano as Stu Croker
 Mike Starr as Lloyd
 Marta DuBois as Dora
 Terry Maratos as Curtis
 Cynthia Preston as Constance Croker
 Angela Alvarado as Serena (as Angela Alvarado Rosa)
 Robert Baker as Vic
 Timothy Bottoms as Gus
 Ann Walker as Irene
 Tom Schanley as Mike Butle
 Maria Jordan as Saloon Girl
 Nygell as Townfolk
 Jimmy Ortega as Rough Rider #4

References

External links
 
 
 

2000 television films
2000 films
2008 Western (genre) films
American Western (genre) television films
Films directed by David S. Cass Sr.
2000s English-language films